The 2012–13 Venezuelan Professional Baseball League season (LVBP by its initialism in Spanish) was the 65th edition of this tournament. It started on October 11, 2012. A total of eight teams participated in the competition, as in the previous season. The tournament was played in honor of Luis Aparicio Ortega, who played in Venezuelan professional baseball between 1931 and 1954 with teams including Magellan, Elders of Vargas, and Gavilanes, in addition to being manager of the Aguilas del Zulia and father of infielder Luis Aparicio.

Teams participating

Regular season

Games

References

2012 13